Kumakiri (written: 熊切) is a Japanese surname. Notable people with the surname include:

, Japanese film director
, Japanese photographer

See also
7472 Kumakiri, a main-belt asteroid

Japanese-language surnames